This is a list of events in Scottish television from 1992.

Events

January
1 January – An edition of Taggart entitled Violent Delights is watched by more than 18 million viewers, the highest audience for the series.
19 January – The first edition of Sunday lunchtime political current affairs programme Scottish Lobby is broadcast on BBC2 Scotland.

February
No events.

March
14 March – 40th anniversary of BBC Scotland on 1.

April
9–10 April – Coverage of the results of the 1992 United Kingdom general election is broadcast both on BBC1 and ITV.

May
No events.

June
No events.

July
No events.

August
6 August – Lord Hope, the Lord President of the Court of Session, Scotland's most senior judge, permits the televising of appeals in both criminal and civil cases, the first time that cameras have been allowed into courts in the United Kingdom.

September
No events.

October
30 October – Scottish soap Take the High Road celebrates its 1,000th episode.

November
30 November – To mark the 53rd European Council meeting, held in Edinburgh on 11–12 December, BBC1 Scotland begins a week of programming dedicated to Europe, including comedy, sport, documentaries and political programmes. Reporting Scotland also carries a week of reports about Britain's relationship with Europe.

December
No events.

Debuts

ITV
5 September – What's Up Doc? (1992–1995)

Television series
Scotsport (1957–2008)
Reporting Scotland (1968–1983; 1984–present)
Top Club (1971–1998)
Scotland Today (1972–2009)
Sportscene (1975–present)
The Beechgrove Garden (1978–present)
Grampian Today (1980–2009)
Take the High Road (1980–2003)
Taggart (1983–2010)
Crossfire (1984–2004)
Wheel of Fortune (1988–2001)
Fun House (1989–1999)
Win, Lose or Draw (1990–2004)

Ending this year
James the Cat (1984–1992)

Deaths
22 March – Melissa Stribling, 64, actress
28 April – John Toye, journalist and presenter

See also 
1992 in Scotland

References 

 
Television in Scotland by year
1990s in Scottish television